Anne Reemann (born 30 December 1962) is an Estonian actress.

In 1988, Reemann graduated from the Estonian Academy of Music and Theatre. Since then, she has worked at the Tallinn City Theatre.

Reemann has acted in numerous movie productions, for example, Sügis.

Personal life
Reemann is married to theatre director Elmo Nüganen. They have three daughters, Saara, Maria-Netti, and Sonja.

References

External links

1962 births
Living people
Estonian stage actresses
Estonian film actresses
Estonian television actresses
Estonian Academy of Music and Theatre alumni
20th-century Estonian actresses
21st-century Estonian actresses
Actresses from Tallinn